Rose gray or rose grey may refer to:

 A horse with a grey coat with a pinkish tinge. See Gray (horse)#Changes in the color of gray horses
 Rose Gray, British chef and cookery writer